The Kars okrug was a district (okrug) of the Kars Oblast of the Russian Empire between 1878 and 1918. Its capital was the city of Kars, presently part of the Kars Province of Turkey and the Amasia District of Armenia. The okrug bordered with the Ardahan okrug in the north, the Kagizman okrug in the south, the Olti okrug in the west, and the Erivan Governorate to its east.

History 
The Kars okrug was one of the four territorial administrative subunits (counties) of the Kars oblast created after its annexation into the Russian Empire in 1878 through the Treaty of San Stefano, following the defeat of the Ottoman Empire.

During World War I, the Kars Oblast became the site of intense battles between the Russian Caucasus Army supplemented by Armenian volunteers and the Ottoman Third Army, the latter of whom was successful in briefly occupying Ardahan on 25 December 1914 before they were dislodged in early January 1915.

On 3 March 1918, in the aftermath of the October Revolution the Russian SFSR ceded the entire Kars Oblast including the Kars okrug through the Treaty of Brest-Litovsk to the Ottoman Empire, who had been unreconciled with its loss of the territory since 1878. Despite the ineffectual resistance of the Transcaucasian Democratic Federative Republic which had initially rejected the aforementioned treaty, the Ottoman Third Army was successful in occupying the Kars Oblast and expelling its 100,000 panic-stricken Armenian inhabitants.

The Ottoman Ninth Army under the command of Yakub Shevki Pasha, the occupying force of the district by the time of the Mudros Armistice, were permitted to winter in Kars until early 1919, after which on 7 January 1919 Major General G.T. Forestier-Walker ordered their complete withdrawal to the pre-1914 Ottoman-frontier. Intended to hinder the westward expansion of the fledgling Armenian and Georgian republics into the Kars Oblast, Yukub Shevki backed the emergence of the short-lived South-West Caucasus Republic with moral support, also furnishing it with weapons, ammunition and instructors.

The South-West Caucasus Republic administered the Kars okrug and neighboring formerly occupied districts for three months before provoking British intervention by order of General G.F. Milne, leading to its capitulation by Armenian and British forces on 10 April 1919. Consequently, the Kars Oblast largely came under the Armenian civil governorship of Stepan Korganian who wasted no time in facilitating the repatriation of the region's exiled refugees.

Despite the apparent defeat of the Ottoman Empire, Turkish agitators were reported by Armenian intelligence to have been freely roaming the countryside of Kars encouraging sedition among the Muslim villages, culminating in a series of anti-Armenian uprisings on 1 July 1919.

The Kars Oblast for the third time in six years saw invading Turkish troops, this time under the command of General Kâzım Karabekir in September 1920 during the Turkish-Armenian War. The disastrous war for Armenia resulted in the permanent expulsion of the region's ethnic Armenian population, many who inexorably remained befalling massacre, resulting in the region joining the Republic of Turkey through the Treaty of Alexandropol on 3 December 1920. Turkey's annexation of Kars and the adjacent Surmalu Uyezd was confirmed in the treaties of Kars and Moscow in 1921, by virtue of the new Soviet regime in Armenia.

Administrative divisions 
The subcounties (uchastoks) of the Kars okrug were:

Demographics

Russian Empire Census 
The plurality of the population indicated Armenian to be their mother tongue, with significant Karapapakh, Russian, Greek, Turkish, and Kurdish speaking minorities.

Kavkazskiy kalendar 
The statistics indicated an overwhelmingly Armenian population in the city of Kars, with sizeable Asiatic Christian, Russian, and Sunni Muslim minorities, however, in the rest of the okrug, Armenians formed the plurality of the population, being closely followed by Sunni Muslim, Roma, Shia Muslim, Russian, Kurdish and Yazidi minorities:

Notes

References

Bibliography 

 
Caucasus Viceroyalty (1801–1917)
Governorates of the Caucasus
History of Ardahan Province
History of Erzurum Province
History of Kars Province
Modern history of Armenia
States and territories established in 1878
States and territories disestablished in 1917
1878 establishments in the Russian Empire
1917 disestablishments in Russia
Soviet Union–Turkey relations